Andrew Jacob Hiebert (1 March 1963 – 16 June 2022), known professionally as Big Rude Jake, was a Canadian songwriter, singer, musician, and bandleader based in Toronto. The original "Swing Punk", he was associated with the neo-swing trend of the 1990s. Jake was drawn to the roots of American music, and incorporated elements of jazz, blues, gospel, jump, and rockabilly, among others. His finger picking ragtime guitar style was inspired by the likes of Mose Scarlet and Leon Redbone.

Jake stepped away from recording and touring for several years, during which time he began practicing Zen Buddhism.  He returned in 2009 with a new album, Quicksand. He started touring Canada and Europe again in 2010, as well as playing in the United States.

Biography 
Butane Fumes & Bad Cologne, the first record by Big Rude Jake and his Gentlemen Players, was recorded in 2 days, on 26 and 27 July 1993 in Toronto. With what the group described as a "ridiculous puny budget", the idea was to record "live off the floor, just like the old cats did". The album was produced by Gordie Johnson of local rock act Big Sugar and Pete Prilesnick. The executive producer was Michael L. Johnson.

Blue Pariah, the second album, followed in 1996, and "Swing Baby!" was aired in college radios across Canada and United States. It was produced by Gordie Johnson, and engineered and mixed by Peter Prilesnik.  Blue Pariah also featured Ashley MacIsaac on violin.  This album was deliberately designed to set Big Rude Jake apart from all the other bands on the swing scene. It uses what some thought to be rather elaborate production techniques.

Seeking to get this record distributed in the US, Big Rude Jake left Toronto, establishing himself in Brooklyn, New York, where he signed a record deal with Roadrunner Records. A third album, Big Rude Jake, was released in 1999. While one of the most well known at the time, it is the hardest album for fans to find, as Jake had control of distribution over all albums except this one.

In 2002, he recorded a fourth album, Live Faust, Die Jung, which is totally different from the first three.  It was produced by Jake Langley and Big Rude Jake, but was never officially released, as he was badly injured one night after being struck by a taxi.  He 'disappeared' from the public eye for a while, going into semi-retirement.  When he began playing publicly again, he used the moniker Chet Valiant, stepping back from the "big suit party animal persona" of Big Rude Jake.  Maintaining a lower profile, he focused on honing his ragtime guitar skills and kept composing.  He began to play a few shows as Big Rude Jake again in 2006.

The album Quicksand was released in Sept 2009. He got married the following week.

On the side, Jake recorded albums with his other bands, Tennessee Voodoo Coupe and Blue Mercury Coupe.

His European tours inspired him to make a new jump blues influenced live album with his 7-piece band and special guests. Live & Out Loud was recorded in November 2011 in front of a live audience at The Drake Hotel in Toronto, funded in large part by fans through the crowdfunding platform RocketHub.

Hiebert also played music for seniors in long term care for many years. 

In 2014, Jake became a father and a few months later, launched his ongoing charity event, Blues For the Red Door. 

In 2020, he launched Fanfare Music Enrichment Services, serving intellectually challenged clients.

He was working on another album, “The Jackhammer Sessions” at the time of his death.

Hiebert died on 16 June 2022, at the age of 59, from metastatic small cell carcinoma of the bladder.

Discography 
 Big Rude Jake
 Butane Fumes & Bad Cologne (1993)
 Blue Pariah (Big Rude, 1996)
 Big Rude Jake (Roadrunner, 1999)
 Live Faust, Die Jung (Big Rude, 2002)
 Brooklyn Blue (Pivotal, 2004)
 Quicksand (Big Rude, 2009)
 Live and Out Loud (2012)

 Tennessee Voodoo Coupe
 Live in Person Radio Transcripts (2011)
 Over the Moon (2013)

References

External links 
Big Rude Jake's official web site
Big Rude Jake's bio on maplemusic.com
Big Rude Jake's bio on VH1 
About the Big Rude Jake album
 
 
 

1963 births
2022 deaths
Canadian jazz singers
Musicians from St. Catharines
Musicians from Toronto
Swing revival musicians